Lapillus (stylized in all caps) is a South Korean girl group formed and managed by MLD Entertainment. The group is composed of six members: Chanty, Shana, Yue, Bessie, Seowon, and Haeun. They debuted on June 20, 2022, with the release of their digital single album Hit Ya!.

Name
In an exclusive press conference with the Philippine media networks ABS-CBN and CNN Philippines, leader Shana explained that their group name is derived from a Latin word. "[It means] a special stone or like a jewel that shines different colors depending on the direction of the light", she said.

History

Pre-debut activities
Shana was a J-Group contestant on Girls Planet 999 placing 16th overall. Chanty is a former actress who was under Star Magic in the Philippines and previously appeared on dramas such as Hiwaga ng Kambat, I Got You, and Starla. Together with Shana, Chanty hosted a YouTube series called ChanSha World from December 2021 to August 2022, which featured the pair playing games and completing challenges, allowing fans to discover more about them ahead of their debut.

2022–present: Introduction, debut with Hit Ya! and Girl's Round Part.1 
On May 16, 2022, MLD Entertainment announced that they would be debuting a new girl group for the first time since their last launch Momoland in 2016. The members were revealed in pairs from May 23 to 25, starting with Shana and Haeun, then Seowon and Yue, and finally Bessie and Chanty. Promotions for the group's debut began on June 13, 2022 with the announcement of the album name and following up with teaser images, videos, and advertisements. The first girl group to debut under MLD Entertainment in six years, Lapillus released their debut digital single album, Hit Ya!, on June 20, 2022, consisting of the title track of the same name and the instrumental. Lapillus' first music show performance aired on June 23, 2022, on Mnet's M Countdown.

On August 31, 2022, it was announced that Lapillus would release their first extended play titled Girl's Round Part.1 and its double lead singles "Gratata" and "Burn With Love" on September 22, 2022.

On December 8, 2022, MLD Entertainment announced that Bessie has temporarily suspended activities due to health reasons.

On January 19, 2023, MLD Entertainment announced that Chanty has temporarily suspended activities due to health reasons.

Members
 Chanty
 Shana – leader
 Yue
 Bessie
 Seowon
 Haeun

Timeline

Discography

Extended plays

Single albums

Singles

Videography

Music videos

Awards and nominations

Ambassadorship 
 Ambassador of the Province of Ilocos Sur in the Philippines (2022)

Notes

References

2022 establishments in South Korea
K-pop music groups
Musical groups established in 2022
Musical groups from Seoul
South Korean dance music groups
South Korean girl groups
South Korean pop music groups